Danijel is a given name. Notable people with the name include:

 Danijel Aleksić (born 1991), Serbian footballer
 Danijel Alibabić (born 1988), Montenegrin singer and songwriter
 Danijel Brezič (born 1976), Slovenian football midfielder
 Danijel Cesarec (born 1983), Croatian footballer
 Danijel Ćulum (born 1989), Bosnian football player
 Danijel Demšar (born 1954), Slovene painter and illustrator of children's books
 Danijel Dežmar (born 1988), Slovenian footballer
 Danijel Furtula (born 1992), Montenegrin discus thrower
 Danijel Galić (born 1987), Croatian volleyball player
 Danijel Gašić (born 1987), Serbian football defender
 Danijel Gatarić (born 1986), Bosnian-German footballer
 Danijel Hrman (born 1975), Croatian football midfielder
 Danijel Jumić (born 1986), Croatian football striker
 Danijel Jusup (born 1961), Croatian basketball coach
 Danijel Klarić (born 1995), Austrian footballer
 Danijel Koncilja (born 1990), Slovenian volleyball player
 Danijel Kovacic (born 1987), German ice hockey goaltender
 Danijel Krivić (born 1980), Bosnian football defender
 Danijel Ljuboja (born 1978), Serbian footballer forward
 Danijel Mađarić (born 1977), Croatian football goalkeeper
 Danijel Mandic (born ), Croatian actor
 Danijel Marčeta (born 1989), Slovenian footballer
 Danijel Majkić (born 1987), Bosnian footballer
 Danijel Mićić (born 1988), Austrian footballer
 Danijel Mihajlović (born 1985), Serbian footballer
 Danijel Milićević (born 1986), Bosnian footballer
 Danijel Milovanović (born 1973), Swedish football player
 Danijel Miškić (born 1993), Croatian football midfielder
 Danijel Morariju (born 1991), Serbian football defender
 Danijel Nizic (born 1995), Australian footballer
 Danijel Pavlović (born 1985),  Serbian singer–songwriter and television personality
 Danijel Petković (born 1993), Montenegrin football goalkeeper
 Danijel Popović (footballer) (1982–2002), Croatian footballer
 Danijel Pranjić (born 1981), Croatian professional footballer
 Danijel Premerl (1904–1975), Croatian football player
 Danijel Premuš (born 1981), Croatian-Italian water polo player
 Danijel Prskalo (born 1990), Bosnia and Herzegovina-born and Austria-based Croatian footballer
 Danijel Radiček (born 1980), Croatian football midfielder
 Danijel Rašić (born 1988), Croatian football player
 Danijel Romić (born 1993), Croatian football player
 Danijel Šarić (born 1977), handball goalkeeper for the Qatari national team
 Danijel Sraka (born 1975), Slovenian film director and producer
 Danijel Štefulj (born 1973), Croatian football player
 Danijel Stojanović (born 1984), Croatian footballer
 Danijel Stojković (born 1990), Serbian football defender
 Danijel Subašić (born 1984), Croatian footballer
 Danijel Subotić (born 1989), Swiss footballer
 Danijel Vušković (born 1981), Croatian footballer
 Danijel Zagorac (born 1987), Croatian football player
 Danijel Žeželj (born 1966), Croatian comic book artist, painter and illustrator
 Danijel Zlatković (born 1996), Serbian football player

See also
 Daniel